Affine logic is a substructural logic whose proof theory rejects the structural rule of contraction. It can also be characterized as linear logic with weakening. 

The name "affine logic" is associated with linear logic, to which it differs by allowing the weakening rule.  Jean-Yves Girard introduced the name as part of the geometry of interaction semantics of linear logic, which characterizes linear logic in terms of linear algebra; here he alludes to affine transformations on vector spaces.

Affine logic predated linear logic.  V. N. Grishin used this logic in 1974, after observing that Russell's paradox cannot be derived in a set theory without contraction, even with an unbounded comprehension axiom.  Likewise, the logic formed the basis of a decidable sub-theory of predicate logic, called 'Direct logic' (Ketonen & Wehrauch, 1984; Ketonen & Bellin, 1989).

Affine logic can be embedded into linear logic by rewriting the affine arrow  as the linear arrow.

Whereas full linear logic (i.e. propositional linear logic with multiplicatives, additives, and exponentials) is undecidable, full affine logic is decidable.

Affine logic forms the foundation of ludics.

Notes

References
 V.N. Grishin, 1974. “A nonstandard logic and its application to set theory,” (Russian). Studies in Formalized Languages and Nonclassical Logics (Russian), 135–171. Izdat, “Nauka,” Moscow.
 V.N. Grishin, 1981. “Predicate and set-theoretic calculi based on logic without contraction rules,” (Russian).  Izvestiya Akademii Nauk SSSR Seriya Matematicheskaya 45(1):47-68. 239.  Math. USSR Izv., 18, no.1, Moscow.
 J. Ketonen and R. Weyhrauch, 1984, A decidable fragment of predicate calculus. Theoretical Computer Science 32:297-307.
 J. Ketonen and G. Bellin, 1989. A decision procedure revisited: notes on Direct Logic.  In Linear Logic and its Implementation.

See also

 Strict logic and relevant logic
 Affine type system, a substructural type system

Substructural logic